Hongxing Jiang is a Chinese-American physicist and engineer working in the field of wide bandgap semiconductors and photonic devices. He is an original inventor of MicroLED. In 2000, the research team led by Hongxing Jiang and Jingyu Lin realized the operation of the first MicroLED and passive driving MicroLED microdisplay. In 2009, he and his  colleagues at III-N Technology, Inc. and Texas Tech University patented and realized the first active driving high-resolution and video-capable microLED microdisplay in VGA format (640 x 480 pixels) via heterogeneous integration of MicroLED  array with CMOS active-matrix driver  and the work was published in the following years.  MicroLEDdisplay market expected to hit USD 24,307.4 million by 2027.

The single-chip high-voltage DC/AC LEDs via on-chip integration of mini- and MicroLED  arrays developed by their team in 2002 have been widely commercialized for general solid-state lighting and automobile headlights.

Under the support of DARPA-MTO’s SUVOS, CMUVT, DUVAP, and VIGIL programs, their research team has contributed to the early developments of III-nitride deep UV emitters and detectors and InGaN energy devices in the United States. These include the prediction and confirmation that Al-rich AlGaN deep UV emitters emit light in the transverse-magnetic (TM) mode, the demonstration of the first UV/blue photonic crystal LEDs (PC-LEDs), AlN deep UV avalanche detectors with an ultrahigh specific detectivity and that his team was one of the first to experimentally determine the Mg acceptor energy level in AlN and to demonstrate the conductivity control in Al-rich AlGaN.   Supported by ARPA-E, their research team has realized semiconductor thermal neutron detectors based on hexagonal boron nitride with a record high detection efficiency among solid-state detectors.

As a side hobby work while in graduate school, Hongxing Jiang and Jingyu Lin have also developed the first analytical formalism based on the Newtonian gravitational force to describe the orbit of a star moving into and out of a galaxy and predicated the phenomenon of mass precession. This effect has been used by astrophysicists to constrain the abundance of dark matter in the solar system and the Galactic Centre.

Education

He obtained PhD in Physics in 1986 from Syracuse University under the guidance of Arnold Honig. He received his BS in Physics in 1981 from Fudan University, China. He came to US for graduate studies through the CUSPEA program.

Career
He has been working on III-nitride wide bandgap semiconductors since 1995. Currently, he is a co-director of the Nanophotonics Center and the inaugural Edward E. Whitacre Jr. endowed chair and Horn Distinguished Professor of Electrical & Computer Engineering within the Edward E. Whitacre Jr. College of Engineering at Texas Tech University (TTU). To be designated a Horn Professor is the highest honor received by a Texas Tech faculty member. In 2008, he relocated his research group to TTU from Kansas State University where he was a University Distinguished Professor of Physics.

Awards
 Recipient of “Global SSL Award of Outstanding Achievements” 2021 for his invention of microLED, awarded by the International SSL (Solid-State Lighting) Alliance (ISA)
 Elected Fellow of the National Academy of Inventors for the invention and development of microLED, 2018
 Fellow of the American Association for the Advancement of Science, 2016
 Fellow of SPIE - the international society for optics and photonics, 2015
 Fellow of the Optical Society of America, 2014
 Fellow of the American Physical Society, 2010

References 

Year of birth missing (living people)
Living people
Fellows of SPIE
Texas Tech University faculty
Fellows of the American Physical Society
21st-century American physicists
20th-century American physicians
Fellows of the American Association for the Advancement of Science
21st-century Chinese physicists
Fellows of the National Academy of Inventors
20th-century Chinese physicists
Fellows of Optica (society)
Syracuse University alumni
Fudan University alumni
Chinese emigrants to the United States